Me and My Friends is a 2008 album by Matt Butcher, accompanied by "The Revolvers". The album received overwhelmingly positive reviews, including commentaries from the Orlando Weekly, The Daily Times and KillerPop.

Track listing
 "Me and My Friends" - 4:42
 "On My Mind" - 3:26
 "Giving My Sadness a Name" - 4:42
 "Grey Skies, Green Shoes" - 4:27
 "Paper Dolls" - 4:08
 "A Famous Country Singer" - 4:54
 "The Company I Keep" - 4:06
 "Woman Left Waiting" - 4:04
 "Keep it Together" - 3:44
 "Grace on a Greyhound Bus" - 4:02
 "Sinking Ships" - 4:00

References

2008 albums